Disca anser is a moth of the family Erebidae first described by Michael Fibiger in 2010. It is known from Malaysia.

The wingspan is 12–13 mm. The forewing is relatively narrow, light brown and suffused with dark grey-brown scales. The terminal line is brown and marked by black interneural dots. The hindwing is unicolorous light greyish brown, without a discal spot and the underside is grey.

References

Micronoctuini
Moths described in 2010
Taxa named by Michael Fibiger